Sérgio Costabile Elia (born 21 January 2000), also known as Sérginho, is a Brazilian footballer.

Career

Youth career 
Sérginho was a two-time Sau Paulo state champion at youth level, both with Santos at U11 level and then again with Corinthians U13s. He also lifted the U17 Copa do Brasil in 2016 and made 9 appearances in the Copa São Paulo de Futebol Júnior at U20 level but never played for the team at senior level.

Orlando City B
In February 2019, Sérginho left Brazil to sign with Orlando City reserve side OCB for the inaugural USL League One season. On 30 March 2019, he made his professional debut, starting in the season opener as Orlando lost 3–1 to FC Tucson. On 22 May 2019, Sérginho scored his first professional goal in a 3–2 win over Richmond Kickers, a long range 30 yard strike into the top-left corner. The goal was awarded USL League One goal of the week.

Loan to Tombense 
Serginho was loaned to Tombense ahead of the 2020 Campeonato Mineiro. He was named to a match day squad for the first time in Tombense's gameweek three match at home to Patrocinense as a substitute but did not make an appearance.

International 
In 2014, Sérginho was called up to train with the Brazil U15 national team.

References

External links 
 

2000 births
Living people
Brazilian footballers
Brazilian expatriate sportspeople in the United States
Association football midfielders
Expatriate soccer players in the United States
Santos FC players
Sport Club Corinthians Paulista players
Oeste Futebol Clube players
Orlando City B players
Tombense Futebol Clube players
USL League One players